The principle of legality in French criminal law holds that no one may be convicted of a criminal offense unless a previously published legal text sets out in clear and precise wording out the constituent elements of the offense and the penalty which applies to it.
(Latin:, in other words, "no crime, no penalty, without a law").

The principle of legality is one of the most fundamental principles of French criminal law, and goes back to the Penal Code of 1791 adopted during the French Revolution, and before that, was developed by Italian criminologist Cesare Beccaria and by Montesquieu. The principle has its origins in the 1789 Declaration of the Rights of Man and of the Citizen, which endows it with constitutional force and limits the conditions in which citizens may be punished for infractions.

History 

The principle of legality of punishment and crime was identified and conceptualized in the Enlightenment. It is generally attributed to Cesare Beccaria but Montesquieu indicated that "the judges of the Nation are only the mouth that pronounces the words of the law" as early as 1748, in The Spirit of the Law.

It appears in particular in article 8 of the Declaration of the Rights of Man and of the Citizen of 1789, and is thus invested with constitutional force, as confirmed several times by the Constitutional Council, such as on 20 January 1981 concerning the 

The principle of legality was initially understood as a guarantee against the arbitrariness of judicial power: "God forbid that the Parliaments should be fair". (it being understood that at the time, that parliaments were jurisdictional bodies). This principle was affirmed during the French Revolution.

The principle of legality gives the power to define the components of offenses and to establish their penalties to the parliament. This attribution corresponds to the faith placed in the power of the parliament by the revolutionaries, since the parliament, expressing the will of the people, can do no wrong. It is the Parliament to which the safeguarding of liberties must be entrusted. This vision differs markedly from the Anglo-Saxon approach, and more particularly the North American one, in which the judge is perceived as the protector of citizens against state power and its tyrannical excesses.

Constitutional force 

The concept of punishment for offenses has its origins in France in the Declaration of the Rights of Man, article 8. The Declaration is recognized in the Preamble to the French Constitution, and is invested with constitutional power, due to the 1971 Liberty of Association decision of the Constitutional Council, which said:

The Constitutional Council stated that it follows from these provisions that the legislator is obliged to define the offences in terms sufficiently clear and precise to exclude arbitrariness.

The legislative application of the principle is found in Article 111-3 of the Penal Code which states:

Division of authority 

Application in time and space 

The principle of criminal liability is defined in the constitution, and a fundamental corollary of it is its application in time. This principle means that criminal sanctions are not retroactive, per article 112-1 of the French penal code. This article also discusses the disposition of cases where acts were committed around the time a new law was taking effect.

International protections for the principle of legality 

The principle of legality has spread and has received a certain recognition at the international with a more or less effective judicial sanction.

United Nations 

The principle is stated in Article 11, paragraph 2 of the Universal Declaration of Human Rights of 1948:

Nonetheless, it is not a legally binding text: it therefore cannot be invoked in the national or international jurisdictions of States which have signed the Universal Declaration. This is not the case with the International Covenant on Civil and Political Rights (ICCPR):

Still, this judicial instrument leaves considerable leeway to the judge of that country, and the United Nations Human Rights Committee, is not recognized as a jurisdiction whose decisions are binding on individual States. The interpretation of this pact, and thus of the principle of legality as it is enshrined in it, is therefore a function of the interpretation of the national judge, in the case of signatory states.

European Convention on Human Rights 

The Convention is the only  international human rights treaty whose judicial effect is guaranteed by an independent jurisdiction, the European Court of Human Rights. Article 7, §1 of the Convention enunciates thus the principle of legality in  criminal matters: 

This provision refers to "national  law" rather than to "national legislation" (in the formal and strict sens of the word), to remain compatible with common law legal systems. The European Court of Human Rights only has jurisdiction if the national legal system has already ruled: it may however have an independent interpretation of the Convention and notably determine what it considers a criminal matter. The European judicial system may of its own accord qualify a matter as criminal, based on the nature of its penalty or on its gravity. Thus, in countries with dual legal jurisdictions, such as France, administrative authorities empowered by the legislature to impose administrative penalties may see themselves applying Article 7.

However, the Convention expresses a reservation as to crimes against humanity.

At the time they were committed, such crimes were not made illegal by a criminal law text. The need to punish the authors of crimes was thus expressed from respect for the "general principles of law recognized by civilized nations", thus tempering the principle of legality enshrined in the Convention.

See also
 Nulla poena sine lege
 Ex post facto law
 Principle of legality in criminal law

References
Notes

Citations

Works cited 
 

Legal doctrines and principles
French criminal law